Murray Hill is a home rule-class city in Jefferson County, Kentucky, United States, and a part of the Louisville Metro government. The population was 582 during the 2010 census.

Geography
Murray Hill is located in northeastern Jefferson County at  (38.290219, -85.588584). It is bordered to the north by Goose Creek, to the south by Langdon Place, and otherwise by consolidated Louisville/Jefferson County.

The community drains northeast to Little Goose Creek, a tributary of Goose Creek and thence the Ohio River.

Demographics

As of the census of 2000, there were 616 people, 282 households, and 161 families residing in the city. The racial makeup of the city was 92.53% White, 2.92% African American, 2.60% Asian, 0.65% from other races, and 1.30% from two or more races. Hispanic or Latino of any race were 0.32% of the population.

There were 282 households, out of which 23.0% had children under the age of 18 living with them, 53.2% were married couples living together, 2.8% had a female householder with no husband present, and 42.9% were non-families. 41.1% of all households were made up of individuals, and 38.3% had someone living alone who was 65 years of age or older. The average household size was 2.18 and the average family size was 3.04.

In the city, the population was spread out, with 21.6% under the age of 18, 3.4% from 18 to 24, 19.8% from 25 to 44, 23.1% from 45 to 64, and 32.1% who were 65 years of age or older. The median age was 49 years. For every 100 females, there were 82.2 males. For every 100 females age 18 and over, there were 73.7 males.

The median income for a household in the city was $48,875, and the median income for a family was $81,826. Males had a median income of $56,667 versus $40,000 for females. The per capita income for the city was $29,608. About 1.2% of families and 1.9% of the population were below the poverty line, including none of those under age 18 and 5.8% of those age 65 or over.

References

External links
City of Murray Hill official website

Cities in Jefferson County, Kentucky
Cities in Kentucky
Populated places established in 1982
1982 establishments in Kentucky